Veracocha is the alias used for the trance music collaboration between Dutch producers Vincent de Moor and Ferry Corsten, both of whom have had solo success under their own names, and using various other pseudonyms.

The only track issued under the Veracocha alias was "Carte Blanche", which was released on the Positiva label in 1999, and reached number 22 in the UK Singles Chart. The song has since been remixed and re-released on many occasions. A bonus track entitled "Drafting" was on the European CD release.

Veracocha also remixed "Ayla" by Ayla (the German DJ and producer Ingo Kunzi).

In 2008, the track was re-released with new mixes by Cosmic Gate and Manuel De La Mare.

References

Dutch trance music groups
Dutch dance music groups